Churi (also Romanized as Chūrī) is a village in Kohurestan Rural District, in the Central District of Khamir County, Hormozgan Province, Iran. At the 2006 census, its population was 53, in 9 families.

References 

Populated places in Khamir County